The Nizaris are the largest segment of the Ismaili Muslims, who are the second-largest branch of Shia Islam after the Twelvers. Nizari teachings emphasize independent  reasoning or ijtihad; pluralism—the acceptance of racial, ethnic, cultural and inter-religious differences; and social justice. Nizaris, along with Twelvers, adhere to the Jaʽfari school of jurisprudence. The Aga Khan, currently Aga Khan IV, is the spiritual leader and Imam of the Nizaris. The global seat of the Ismaili Imamate is in Lisbon, Portugal.

Early history

Nizari Isma'ili history is often traced through the unbroken hereditary chain of guardianship, or walayah, beginning with Ali Ibn Abi Talib, who Shias believe the prophet Muhammad declared his successor as Imam during the latter's final pilgrimage to Mecca, and continues in an unbroken chain to the current Imam, Shah Karim Al-Husayni, the Aga Khan.

Fatimid usurpation, schism, and the flight of the Nizari

From early in his reign, the Fatimid Caliph-Imam Al-Mustansir Billah had publicly named his elder son Nizar as his heir to be the next Fatimid Caliph-Imam. Dai Hassan-i Sabbah, who had studied and accepted Ismailism in Fatimid Egypt, had been made aware of this fact personally by al-Mustansir. After Al-Mustansir died in 1094, Al-Afdal Shahanshah, the all-powerful Armenian Vizier and Commander of the Armies, wanted to assert, like his father before him, dictatorial rule over the Fatimid State. Al-Afdal engineered a palace coup, placing his brother-in-law, the much younger and dependent Al-Musta'li, on the Fatimid throne. Al-Afdal claimed that Al-Mustansir had made a deathbed decree in favour of Musta'li and thus got the Ismaili leaders of the Fatimid Court and Fatimid Dawa in Cairo, the capital city of the Fatimids, to endorse Musta'li, which they did, realizing that the army was behind the palace coup.

In early 1095, Nizar fled to Alexandria, where he received the people's support and where he was accepted as the next Fatimid Caliph-Imam after Al-Mustansir, with gold dinars being minted in Alexandria in Nizar's name (one such coin, found in 1994, is in the collection of the Aga Khan Museum). In late 1095, Al-Afdal defeated Nizar's Alexandrian army and took Nizar prisoner to Cairo where he had Nizar executed.

After Nizar's execution, the Nizari Ismailis and the Musta'li Ismailis parted ways in a bitterly irreconcilable manner. The schism finally broke the remnants of the Fatimid Empire, and the now-divided Ismailis separated into the Musta'li following (inhabiting regions of Egypt, Yemen, and western India) and those pledging allegiance to Nizar's son Al-Hadi ibn Nizar (living in regions of Iran and Syria). The latter Ismaili following came to be known as Nizari Ismailism.

Imam Al-Hadi, being very young at the time, was smuggled out of Alexandria and taken to the Nizari stronghold of Alamut Castle in the Elburz Mountains of northern Iran, south of the Caspian Sea and under the regency of Dai Hasan bin Sabbah.

The offshoot of these Muhammad-Shahi Nizari Ismailis recognize the elder son of Shamsu-d-Dīn Muḥammad, the 28th Qasim-Shahi Imam, named Alā ad-Dīn Mumin Shāh (the 26th Imam of the Muhammad-Shahi Nizari Ismailis). They recognize this line of Imams down to the disappearance of the 40th Imam, Amir Muhammad al-Baqir, in 1796. There are followers of this line of Nizari Imams in Syria today, locally called the Jafariyah.

Origin of the Fidai
Followers of the young Imam Hadi who wished to be fighters were trained as Fidai (Fedayeen), whose bravery and self-sacrificing spirituality was due to their belief that the Nizari Imam-ul-waqt ("Imam of the time") had the noor (light) of God within him. As such it became a religious duty for the Fidai to obey every dictate of their Imam-ul-waqt and to protect him and their community of believers without compromise even to the extent of dying for their cause.

Under Hassan-i Sabbah in Iran, and Rashid ad-Din Sinan in Syria, the Nizari Fidai targeted the most powerful enemy leaders faced by these new Nizari Ismaili communities in the Elburz Mountains of northern Iran and in the mountains of the Levantine coast, the Jabal Bahra, overlooking the eastern Mediterranean Sea.

Assassins
The Fidai were feared as the Assassins, but did not assassinate for payment. Although they were trained in the art of spying and combat, they also practiced Islamic mysticism at the highest level. This religious ardor turned them into formidable foes, as in the anecdote of Count Henry of Champagne. Returning from Armenia, Henry spoke with Grand Master Rashid ad-Din Sinan (known to the West as "The Old Man of the Mountain") at one of his castles, al-Kahf, in Syria. Henry pointed out that since his army was bigger by far than Sinan's, Sinan should pay him an annual tribute.

Sinan refused, asserting that his army was far stronger, in spirit and unquestioning obedience if not in numbers. He invited Henry to witness this obedience and sacrificial spirit of his Fidai. Sinan signalled to a Fidai standing on the parapet of a high wall of his castle, to jump. The Fidai called out "God is Great" and unhesitatingly took a headlong death dive into the rocks far below.

The bewildered Henry asked Sinan the cause for the suicidal jump. Sinan pointed once again to the Fidai who had taken the place of the now dead Fidai. Again Sinan gave a signal to the Fidai to jump and the second Fidai also called out "God is Great" and jumped to his death. Henry was visibly shaken by the experience of witnessing the two Fidais' total disregard for their own lives. He accepted Sinan's terms of peace on a non-tribute-paying basis. The Nizaris thus averted debilitating wars against them because of their Fidais' feats of self-sacrifice and assassinations of powerful enemy leaders to demonstrate the will and commitment of the community to live free from being a vassal to any Levantine power.

The Fidai were some of the most feared assassins in the then known world. Sinan ordered assassinations against politicians and generals such as the great Kurdish general and founder of the Ayyubid dynasty, Saladin. A sleeping Saladin had a note from Sinan delivered to him by a Fidai planted in his entourage. The note was pinned to his pillow with a dagger, and it informed Saladin that he had been spared this once and should give up his anti-Nizari militancy. A shaken Saladin quickly made a truce with Sinan.

Subsequently, the Fidai aided the Muslim cause against the Christian Crusaders of the Third Crusade which included Richard the Lionheart of England. Saladin having by now established a friendly relationship with Sinan, the Nizari Fidai themselves joined Saladin's forces to defeat the Crusaders in the last great battle between the two forces. Later on, when "the Nizaris faced renewed Frankish hostilities, they received timely assistance from the Ayyubids".

The Fidais' apparent lack of fear of personal injury or even death could not be understood by the Crusaders, who propagated the black legends of the so-called Assassins. According to Daftary, these were "fictions ... meant to provide satisfactory explanations for behavior that would otherwise seem strange to the medieval Western mind". These black legends were then further popularized in the Western world by Marco Polo, the Venetian storyteller who had, in fact, never investigated Sinan, in contradiction to his claim that he had. Polo asserted that Sinan fed hashish to his drugged followers, the so-called Hashishins (Assassins), so as to fortify them with the type of courage to commit the assassinations of the most intrepid kind.

This tale of the "Old Man of the Mountain" was assembled by Marco Polo and accepted by Joseph von Hammer-Purgstall, a 19th-century Austrian orientalist responsible for much of the spread of this legend. Until the 1930s, Hammer-Purgstall's retelling of Marco Polo's fiction served as the standard description of the Nizari Ismailis across Europe. "The Russian orientalist Vladimir Alexeyevich Ivanov ... gained access also to Nizari literature preserved in Central Asia, Persia, Afghanistan and elsewhere ... compiled the first detailed catalogue of (Nizari and Fatimid) Ismaili works, citing some 700 separate titles attesting to the hitherto unknown richness and diversity of (Nizari and Fatimid) Ismaili literature and literary traditions".

Succession

As with all Shia Muslims, the succession of leadership following the death of the prophet Muhammed is of major importance to Nizaris. Nizaris believe that at al-Ghadir Khumm, by God's direct command, Muhammad designated his cousin and son-in-law Ali—the husband of his daughter Fatimah—as his successor. As such, Ali became the spiritual successor and the first Imam in the continuing line of hereditary Imams that leads up to the present 49th imam Prince Shah Karim Al Hussaini.

The Nizari Ismaili tradition is unique in that it is the only tradition that has this continuity of hereditary divine authority vested in the Imamim-Mubeen. In all the Sunni traditions, the Imamim-Mubeen is interpreted as the Quran itself; and in all the Shia traditions, except the Shia Nizari, the Imamim-Mubeen is the last Imam of a dynasty that went into occultation. However, in Nizari Ismailism, the Imamim-Mubeen is a living human Imam who is never in occultation, who will never ever be absent from this world but will always be perpetually present and physically alive, and who is designated as the inheritor of an Imamate passed down from father to son. This tradition has continued for almost 1400 years.

Further schisms
The Ismailis and the Twelvers split over the succession to Imam Ja'far al-Sadiq. Ismailis contend that Jafar had designated his son Isma'il ibn Jafar as his heir and the next Imam in the hereditary line, and thus the Isma'ilis follow the Imamate of Isma'il and his progeny. Although Imam Ismail predeceased his father, Isma'il supposedly had designated his own son Muhammad ibn Ismail as the next hereditary Imam to follow. In opposition to this belief, the Twelvers believe that Imam Ismail's younger brother Musa al Kadhim was, from the beginning, the rightful successor to Imam Jafar and that Ismail was never a contender.

The Nizari Ismailis have since split from others, initially from the Qarmatians, Druze, Musta'li Ismailis, Muhammad Shahi Nizari Ismailis, and Satpanthis, the last two splitting from the Nizari branch of Ismailism in the 14th and 15th centuries.

The Nizari Ismailis have always maintained that the Imamah (also known as 'Imamat') can only be inherited from the current Imam to a direct descendant in a father-to-son (or grandson) hereditary lineage starting with Imam Ali and then to Imam Hussain and so on until their present and living 49th Imam, Prince Karim al-Husayni Aga Khan IV.

The Nizaris regard Hassan bin (son of) Ali as a Trustee Imam (imam al-mustawda) as opposed to a Hereditary Imam (imam al-mustaqarr). This fact is clearly demonstrated in the recitation of the Nizari Ismailis’ daily prayers three times a day in which although Hassan bin Ali is revered as part of the Prophet's personal family (Ahl al-Bayt), his name is not included in the hereditary lineage from their first Imam, Imam Ali, to their 49th Imam Prince Karim al Hussaini. If Hassan bin Ali's name were to be included as one of the Ismaili Imams in their prayer recitation then the present Imam Prince Karim of the Nizari Ismailis would have to be the 50th Imam and not the 49th Imam - the way he has identified himself and is known to the world.

Contemporary history

All Nizārī Ismā'īlīs now accept Prince Shah Karim Al-Husayni, the Aga Khan IV, as their Imām-i-Zaman (Imam of the Time). He is referred to in Persian as Khudawand (Lord of the Time), in Arabic as Maulana (Master) or Hāzar Imām (Present Imam). Karim succeeded his grandfather Sir Sultan Muhammad Shah Aga Khan III as Imām in 1957, when he was just 20 and still an undergraduate at Harvard University. He was referred to as "the Imam of the Atomic Age". The period following his accession can be characterized as one of rapid political and economic change. Planning of programs and institutions became increasingly difficult due to the rapid changes in the newly emerging post-colonial nations where many of his followers resided. Upon becoming Imām, Karim's immediate concern was the preparation of his followers, wherever they lived, for the changes that lay ahead. This rapidly evolving situation called for bold initiatives and new programs to reflect developing national aspirations in the newly independent nations.

In Africa, Asia, and the Middle East, a major objective of the community's social welfare and economic programs, until the mid-1950s, had been to create a broad base of businessmen, agriculturists, and professionals. The educational facilities of the community tended to emphasize secondary-level education. With the coming of independence, each nation's economic aspirations took on new dimensions, focusing on industrialization and the modernization of agriculture. The community's educational priorities had to be reassessed in the context of new national goals, and new institutions had to be created to respond to the growing complexity of the development process.

In 1972, under the regime of the then President Idi Amin, Ismā'īlīs and Asians were expelled from Uganda, despite being citizens of the country and having lived there for generations. The Imam took urgent steps to facilitate the resettlement of Ismāʿīlīs displaced from Uganda, but also Tanzania, Kenya, and from Burma. Owing to his personal efforts, most found homes, not only in Asia, but also in Europe and North America. Most of the basic resettlement problems were overcome remarkably rapidly. This was due to the adaptability of the Ismāʿīlīs themselves—helped in particular by their education—their linguistic abilities, the efforts of the host countries, and the moral and material support from Ismāʿīlī community programs.

In view of the importance that Islām places on maintaining a balance between the spiritual well-being of the individual and the quality of his life, the Imām's guidance deals with both aspects of the life of his followers. The Aga Khan has encouraged Ismā'īlī Muslims settled in the industrialized world to contribute towards the progress of communities in the developing world through various development programs. The Economist noted that Isma'ili immigrant communities integrated seamlessly as immigrant communities, and did better at attaining graduate and post-graduate degrees, "far surpassing their native, Hindu, Sikh, fellow Muslims, and Chinese communities".

Silver Jubilee
From July 1982 to July 1983, to celebrate the present Aga Khan's Silver Jubilee marking the 25th anniversary of his accession to the Imamate, many new social and economic development projects were launched. These ranged from the establishment of the US$450 million international Aga Khan University with its Faculty of Health Sciences and teaching hospital based in Karachi; the expansion of schools for girls and medical centers in the Hunza region, one of the remote parts of Northern Pakistan bordering on China and Afghanistan; the establishment of the Aga Khan Rural Support Program in Gujarat, India; and the extension of existing urban hospitals and primary health care centers in Tanzania and Kenya. These initiatives form part of an international network of institutions involved in fields that range from education, health, and rural development, to architecture and the promotion of private sector enterprise and together make up the Aga Khan Development Network.

Golden Jubilee
From 2007 to 2008, during the Golden Jubilee marking 50 years of his Imamate, the Aga Khan commissioned a number of projects: renowned Pritzker Prize winning Japanese architect Fumihiko Maki was commissioned to design a new kind of community structure, resembling an embassy, in Ottawa, Canada; and the Delegation of the Ismaili Imamat, to be composed of two large interconnected spaces an atrium and a courtyard, opened on 8 December 2008. The atrium is an interior space, to be used all year round. It is protected by a unique glass dome made of multi-faceted, angular planes assembled to create the effect of rock crystal; the Aga Khan asked Maki to consider the qualities of "rock crystal", which was valued by the Imams of the Fatimid Empire, in his design. Within the glass dome is an inner layer of woven glass-fibre fabric which will appear to float and hover over the atrium. The delegation building is located on Sussex Drive near the Canadian parliament. Future delegation buildings are planned for other capitals, beginning with Lisbon, Portugal.

In addition to primary and secondary schools, the Aga Khan academies, were set up to educate future leaders in the developing world. The Aga Khan Museum, in Toronto, Canada, is the first museum in the West dedicated to Islamic civilization. Completed in 2013, it is dedicated to the "acquisition, preservation and display of artefacts – from various periods and geographies – relating to the intellectual, cultural, artistic and religious heritage of Islamic communities". A series of new Isma'ili centres are underway: including in Toronto, Ontario; Houston, Texas; Dushanbe and the Pamir, Tajikistan.

Diamond Jubilee
During 2017–2018 the Ismaili Muslim community commemorated 60 years since the Aga Khan became the 49th hereditary Imam on 11 July 1957.

Seat of the Ismaili Imamate
Following an agreement with the Republic of Portugal in 2015, on 11 July 2018, the Aga Khan officially designated the Henrique de Mendonça Palace, located on Rua Marquês de Fronteira in Lisbon, as the "Diwan (seat) of the Ismaili Imamat".

Theology

God

Nizari Ismaili theology is the pre-eminent negative or apophatic theology of Islam because it affirms the absolute Oneness of God (tawhid) through negating all names, descriptions, conceptions, and limitations from God. The Ismaili theology of tawhid goes back to the teachings of the early Shi‘a Imams, especially Imam Ali ibn Abi Talib (d. 661), Imam Muhammad al-Baqir (d. 743), and Imam Ja‘far al-Sadiq (d. 765). Additionally, a number of eminent Ismaili Muslim philosophers—Abu Ya‘qub al-Sjistani (d. 971), Ja‘far ibn Mansur al-Yaman (d. 960), Hamid al-Din al-Kirmani (d. 1021), al-Mu’ayyad al-Din Shirazi (d. 1077), Nasir-i Khusraw (d. 1088), Abd al-Karim al-Shahrastani (d. 1153), Nasir al-Din al-Tusi (d. 1273)—consolidated and refined the Ismaili theology of tawhid using the strongest philosophical arguments of their time. Even in the present age, Imam Shah Karim al-Husayni Aga Khan IV, the present and 49th hereditary Imam of the Shi‘a Ismaili Muslims, continues to stress the absolute and utter transcendence of God. At the 1975 All-Ismailia Paris Conference, the Ismaili Imam endorsed and approved the following resolution concerning the contemporary Ismaili position on the concept of God:

The absolute transcendence of God to be emphasized, and the Ismaili belief in God to be expounded in association with the general stress on the transcendence of God in the Qur’an, as exemplified particularly in the Surat al-Ikhlas.

The Ismaili Concept of tawhid can be summarized as follows:

God is beyond all names and attributes (including every name and attribute mentioned in the Qur’an, such as the Powerful, the Living, the First, the Last, etc.);
God is beyond matter, energy, space, time and change;
God is beyond all human conceptions of the imagination and intellect;
God is beyond both positive and negative qualities—He is not knowing and not not knowing and He is not powerful and not not powerful;
God is beyond all philosophical and metaphysical categories—spiritual/material, cause/effect, eternal/temporal, substance/accident, essence/attributes, and existence/essence—God is above existence and non-existence;
When God is associated with a name or attribute in scripture, ritual or everyday speech, e.g. "God is knowing", the real meaning of this statement is that God is the source and originator of that power or quality, i.e. God is the originator of all knowledge but He Himself is beyond actually possessing knowledge as an attribute;
God's Creative Act is called His Word or Command—this Command is a single, eternal, and continuous act which continually gives existence to and sustains all created or conditioned realities in every moment of their existence.

The full recognition of tawhid, in a mode beyond human rational discourse, is a spiritual and mystical realization in the human soul and intellect called ma'rifah. In the Ismaili tariqah of Islam, the ma‘rifah of the tawhid of God is attained through the Imam of the Time. The perfect soul of the Imam of the Time always experiences the fullness of the ma‘rifah of God and his murids reach that recognition through the recognition of the Imam. This is the essential role of the Imam of the time and embodied in the Ismaili Muslim daily prayer called du'a'. The Aga Khan III also alluded to this when he said that the "real miracle of Hazrat Ali is that he brought people to the Truth".

Quran

Nizaris, like all Muslims, consider the Quran, the central religious text of Islam, to be the word of God. Nizaris employ tafsir (the science of Quranic commentary) for zahir, or exoteric understanding, and tawil (the Quranic poetic metre), for batin, or esoteric understanding.

Tawil stems from the Quranic root word "to return to" the original meaning of the Quran. While acknowledging the importance of both, the zahir and the batin in religion, the batin informs on how the zahir is to be practiced. More importantly, the batin guides the believer on a spiritual journey of discovery of the intangible truth (haqiqa) that engages both the intellect (''aql) and the spirit (ruh) with the ultimate destination being that of gnostic enlightenment (marifa or fana-fillah).

The word Quran means "recitation". When Muslims speak of "the Quran" in the abstract, they usually mean the scripture as recited rather than the printed work or any translation of it. For the Nizari Ismaili, the tafsir and tawil of the Quran are embodied most perfectly in the being of the Imam-i-Zaman (the Imam of the Time), due to his divinity as "the Imam from God Himself" as expressed in the third part of their Shahada.

Pillars of Islam

Isma'ilism holds that there are seven pillars in Islam, each of which possesses both an exoteric ("outer" or zahir) expression and an esoteric ("inner" or batin) one.

The Foundation:

Ismailis believe in the basic principle of One God, and Prophet Muhammed is the final messenger. However, they believe that Muhammed's progeny are the rightful successors of Islam, hence, they seek guidance from "the living imam", who is a living descendant of Muhammed's family.

The Seven Pillars consist of:

 Walayah Guardianship: cultivating a pure loving, affectionate attachment to, and intimacy with, God—manifested in the Prophets and the Imams by their continually offering loyalty, allegiance, devotion and obedience to God—and to those who manifest divine guardianship—the Prophets and Imams. For the Nizari, God is the true desire of every soul.
 Taharah Purity: physical cleanliness, keeping a hygienic home, and personal presence, but also purity of the heart and the soul.
 Salat Prayer: Nizari Isma'ili, as do Imami Shia, practice the Salaah as outlined by the Ja'farī madhhab, the prayer being performed to mark important festivals. Nizari more generally perform a ritual du'a three times a day. The Nizari, like the Sufi, practice dhikr—"remembrance" of God, the Prophets, and the Imams—which can take the form of a melodic communal chant or be performed in silence.
 Zakah Charity: voluntarily share one's own knowledge or skills, as well as tithing. Nizari are encouraged to actively volunteer in the running of community spaces, and offering their specialized knowledge to the wider community—including legal, medical, or other vocational expertise. Zakah also refers to tithing—Islamic tradition holds that Muhammad was designated to collect zakāt from believers and it is now the duty of believers to give alms to the Imām or his representative, to be redistributed to support local and international development.
 Sawm Fasting: Fasting during the month of Ramadan and to mark the new moon is believed to be beneficial for those who are overwrought with the base ego—desire, rage, and the self. Isma'ili who are following the tariqa (path) seek to transcend the base ego so as to attain an inner being that is in harmony. They absorb food as nourishment for a healthy, peaceful, body and mind, as the more important fast is that of mind and heart, where one abstains from unworthy concerns and worldly thoughts, and can be broken by succumbing to the base ego, and its insatiable desires.
 Hajj Pilgrimage: There are two different kinds of Hajj for Nizari Isma'ilis. The first is the Hajj-i-Zahiri - which is the pilgrimage to the physical Ka‘bah in Mecca that all able Muslims must complete at least once in their lives. The second is the Hajj-i-Batini - which is a pilgrimage to see the Imam of the Time, who is held to be the "Esoteric Ka‘bah". In addition, pilgrimage to other cities such as Medina, Jerusalem, Najaf, and Karbala is also encouraged (see also: Holiest sites in Shia Islam).
 Jihad Struggle The definition of jihad is controversial as it has two meanings: "the Greater Struggle" and "the Lesser Struggle", the latter of which means a confrontation with the enemies of the faith. The Nizari interpret "adversaries" of the faith as personal and social vices and those individuals who harm the peace of the faith and avoid provocation and use force only as a final resort only in self-defense.

Rationalism

Various rival approaches to the challenge that Greek rationalism posed to Quranic revelation permeated early Islamic society. The Athʿaris considered Kalam (reason) as contradictory to Islam, and falsafa (philosophy) as antagonistic to faith, which asserts the absolute supremacy of revelation, and the abandonment of reason in the spiritual and secular space (which are interconnected within orthodox Islam). The Mu'tazilis took a less absolutist approach, allowing for a limited role of reason (Kalam). Isma'ilis adopted an altogether more philosophical approach, in which only through reasoned discourse could one attain understanding of revelation, social structure, and individualism, as well as the functioning of the natural world. For this reason Isma'ilis produced a relatively scant collection of theological discourse in comparison to other Shia, and the Sunni. Yet they had a leading place in the development of philosophical discourse within the Islamic world.

While Nizaris subscribe to the Imami jurisprudence, they also follow in part the Ja'fāriyya Madhhab (school of Jurisprudence), which is believed by Shias to have been founded by Imam Ja'far as-Sadiq. Nizaris adhere to supremacy of Kalam in the interpretation of scripture, and in the temporal relativism of understanding, as opposed to fiqh (traditional legalism), which adheres to an absolutist approach to revelation.

For Nizaris, there exists a dialectic between revelation and human reasoning, based on a synergy of Islamic scripture and classical Greek philosophy, in particular Aristotelian reasoning and neoplatonic metaphysics. It seeks to extend an understanding of religion and revelation to identify the outwardly apparent (zahir), and also to penetrate to the roots, to retrieve and disclose that which is the inner underlying (batin). This process of discovery engages both the intellect ('aql) and the spirit (ruh), generating an integral synergy to illuminate and disclose truths (haqi'qat) culminating in gnosis (ma'rifat). Parallels have also been noted between the Nizari version of Imamah and the Platonic idea of a philosopher king.

 Eschatology 
Over the many phases of Nizārī Ismāʿīlī history – pre-Fāṭimid, Fāṭimid, Alamūt, Post-Alamūt, Anjudan, etc., there has never been a single unified view of eschatology. While there are certainly eschatological ideas from the Pre-Fāṭimid period that have been carried unto the present day, particularly those of Abū Ya’qūb al-Sijistānī and his intellectual disciples, each phase has brought in original ideas and renewed those of the past. The academic field of Ismāʿīlī eschatology is one that has been rarely studied in western secondary literature, and the little work that has been done on Ismāʿīlī eschatology primarily surrounds the event of the proclamation of a qiyāmah during the Alamūt period. Otherwise, there have been zero studies published on the eschatologies of pre-Fāṭimid Ismāʿīlī thinkers and post-Alamūt Ismaili thinkers. Furthermore, no work done has been done on the eschatology of the South Asian traditions of Nizārī Ismāʿīlism.
The Ismāʿīlīs, like the falāsifa (Islamic Neoplatonic-Aristotelian philosophers), have understood resurrection, paradise, and hell through taʾwīl (esoteric interpretation) and, thus, have all argued that these are spiritual realties and not physical, material realities. On the rewards of Paradise, al-Sijistānī writes in the Kitāb al-Yanābīʿ:لما كان قصارى الثواب انما هي اللذة ، وكانت اللذة الحسية منقطعة زائلة ، وجب ان تكون التي ينالها المثاب ازلية غير فانية ، باقية غير منقطعة . وليست لذة بسيطة باقية على حالاتها غير لذة العلم . كان من هذا القول وجوب لذه العلم للمثاب  في دار البقاء ، كما قال الله عز وجل : اكلها دائم وظلها تلك عقبى الذين اتقوا

“Because the limit of reward is pleasure, and sensual pleasure is ephemeral, and it is necessary that the reward which is obtained be eternal and not ephemeral, everlasting and not discontinuous. And there is no simple, everlasting pleasure except the pleasure of knowledge. From this statement, it necessarily follows that the pleasure of knowledge is the reward in the hereafter, as God, glorified and sublime, said: “Its fruit is everlasting and its shade, that is the destination of those who are righteous (Qurʾān 13:35)”According to al-Sijistānī, the most important piece of knowledge to acquire is the recognition of the one who initiates the resurrection, whom he calls Ṣāḥib al-Qiyāmah (Lord of Resurrection). Al-Sijistānī writes in the Kitāb al-Yanābīʿ:فترى الناس على طبقتين : طبقة ممن آمنوا به وصدقوه وانتظروا ظهور، فهم بذلك النور مقتبسون، متنعمون ، مستبشرون . وطبقة ممن كذبوا به وغفلوا عن حده ۲ ، فهم بذلك النور ايضاً متحرقون ، معاقبون

“So you will see people divided into two classes: One class consists of those who believe in the Lord of Resurrection, pronounce his Truth, and await his appearance. They are in that Light, acquiring knowledge, blessed, and rejoicing. The other class consists of those who deny him and ignore his rank. They are in the Light also, but are burned and punished”Paradise and Hellfire in the Nizārī Ismāʿīlī tradition, thus, are not characterized by material forms, sensual pleasures, and physical burning, rather Paradise is understood to be the presence of knowledge of real truths while Hellfire is understood to be ignorance. The Nizārī Ismāʿīlī philosopher-theologians, as can be seen in the passage quoted above, did not believe that Paradise and Hellfire were “places” that souls inhabit, rather – because the rewards and punishments are spiritual – they are something the soul directly experiences in itself. Al-Sijistānī explicitly says in the passage above that both classes of people are exposed to same Light (فهم بذلك النور ايضاً), however one class experiences this Light as blessings whilst the other experiences it as burning. These states correspond not to location, but to the level of knowledge in the soul. Additionally, the most famous intellectual disciple of al- Sijistānī – Nāṣir-i Khusraw – writes in the Shish Fasl:“[I]t is inevitable that the human soul should return to the Universal Soul. The question only concerns the manner in which it will return...If, however, the return of the individual soul to its source is not in harmony, it will meet with suffering hardships whose painfulness is described by being placed in the midst of fire, the position which will never come to an end”Thus, for Nāṣir-i Khusraw, all souls return to the same spiritual abode but those souls which are ignorant will experience pain, as if “being placed in the midst of fire”. While Nāṣir-i Khusraw suggests here the suffering is eternal, he has in another text – specifically the Wajh-i Dīn – indicated that the pains of Hell are temporary and that the Prophet will come on the Day of Resurrection to blow out the fires of Hell and rescue its inhabitants. While both infernalist and universalist positions have existed as legitimate views in the community, annihilationist views have existed as well, specifically being introduced by Naṣīr al-Dīn al-Ṭūsī. Like both al-Sijistānī and Nāṣir-i Khusraw, Naṣīr al-Dīn al-Ṭūsī believed that paradise and hell were spiritual and mental states that the soul experiences and not physical places or sensual pains and desires. While Naṣīr al-Dīn al-Ṭūsī believed that the punishment of ignorant, damned souls was eternal, he believed this eternal punishment took the form of annihilation, i.e. permanent non-existence. He writes:“There is also only one real Hell, and that is eternal punishment, everlasting disappointment and eternal non-existence; the meaning of all this is being outcast from God in every sense of the word” The last most public eschatological view espoused by any Ismāʿīlī was written by the 48th Ismāʿīlī Imām – Sulṭān Muḥammad Shāh Āgā Khān III – who endorses a universalist position in regards to salvation and specifically states in his Memoirs that he prays “that all may be reconciled in Heaven in a final total absolution”. The position of Āgā Khān III can be said to be generally in line with classical Ismāʿīlī views, as well as the views of the falāsifa and Sunnī-Sufīs like Ibn ʿArabi (such as in his Futūḥāt al-Makkiyya) and those of the Shīʿī ʿIrfān tradition, like Mullā Ṣadra (such as in his Tafsīr Sūrat al-Fātiḥa).

Community

World Constitution

The present Aga Khan continued the practice of his predecessor and gave constitutions to Ismā'īlī communities in the US, Canada, several European countries, the Persian Gulf, Syria, and Iran, following a process of consultation within each constituency. In 1986, he promulgated a World Constitution that, for the first time, brought the social governance of the worldwide Ismā'īlī community into a single structure with built-in flexibility to account for diverse circumstances of different regions. Served by volunteers appointed by and accountable to the Imam, the Constitution functions to enable individual creativity in an ethos of group responsibility to promote the common well-being.

Like its predecessors, the present constitution is founded on adherence to the basic principles of Islam, belief in one God and Muhammad as the seal of the prophets, and on each Ismā'īlī's spiritual allegiance to the Imām of the Time, which is separate from the secular allegiance that all Ismā'īlīs owe as citizens to their national entities. The present Imam and his predecessor emphasized every Ismāʿīlī's allegiance to his or her country as a fundamental obligation. These obligations are discharged not by passive affirmation but through responsible engagement and active commitment to uphold national integrity and contribute to peaceful development.

Places of Worship

Jama'at Khana (from the Arabic Jamaat (congregation) and the Persian Khaneh (house)) are Isma'ili houses of prayer, study, and community. They usually contain separate spaces for prayer and a social hall for community gatherings.
There are no principle architectural guidelines for Jama'at Khana, although inspiration is drawn from Islamic architecture and local architectural traditions to seamlessly and discreetly blend them with the local architectural environment, informed by a minimalist design aesthetic.

Larger Jama'at Khana are referred to as Darkhanas, or "Isma'ili Centers" in the West, and have been referred to as "Isma'ili Cathedrals" by observers. While containing prayer and social infrastructure albeit on a larger scale, they may also contain auditoriums and lecture spaces, libraries, offices, and council chambers, as they act as the regional or national governing centers for community administration.

Jama'at Khana, particularly the larger centers, offer their spaces to the community at large, and arrange guided tours. However, during the obligatory prayer (Holy Du'a) only Isma'ili are allowed to enter the prayer hall (masjid).

From the Encyclopaedia of Ismailism by Mumtaz Ali Tajddin:

In the Ismaili tariqah, the guardian of each Jamatkhana is called mukhi (in the South-Asian tradition) or Sheikh (in the Arab tradition) there are also other names that are applied based on the cultural context of the Jamat, mukhi is a word derived from mukhiya means foremost. Since the Imam physically is not present all the times in the Jamatkhana, the Mukhi acts [as the] tangible symbol of the Imam's authority. In the big jamat, the Mukhi was assisted by a caretaker called tha'nak. Later, the office of kamadia (from kamdar [meaning] accountant) was created. The Mukhi and Kamadia are the traditional titles going back to the pre-Aga Khan period when they enjoyed considerable local power. Their responsibilities include officiating over the daily rituals in the Jamatkhana, but they are primarily lay officials. Since the wholesale reorganizations undertaken by the Imams, the local committees are now tied into an elaborately hierarchical administrative structure of boards and councils.

Symbols

The Fatimids adopted Green (akhdar) as the colour of their standard, which symbolized their allegiance to Ali, who, in order to thwart an assassination attempt on Muhammad, once wrapped himself in a green coverlet to appear to be Muhammad. When Hassan I Sabbah captured Alamut, it is said he hoisted the green standard over the fortress, it was later reported that Hassan I Sabbah prophesied that when the Hidden Imam made himself known he would hoist a red flag, which Hasan II did during his appearance. Following the destruction of Alamut, Isma'ili hoisted both green and red flags above the tombs of their Imams. Green and Red were combined in the 19th century Isma'ili flag known as "My Flag".

The Fatimids also used a white standard with gold inlays, and the Caliph Imams often wore white with gold, as Isma'ili Imams do today. Isma'ili use a gold crest on white standard to symbolize the authority of Imamate, and often wear white in the presence of their Imam.

The Rub el Hizb, an eight pointed star, is often used by Isma'ilis as a symbol.

Practices

Marriage
Marriage (urs, عرس) is a legal wedding contract (Nikah,  النكاح) between a consenting adult man and a woman. As a contract, it allows both parties to add certain conditions. Nizari ideals of marriage envision a long-term union.

Since marriage is not considered a sacrament, Nizari Isma'ili consider secular court marriages in the West as valid legal contracts. However many Isma'ili couples opt to have both a court marriage to secure legal recognition as well as a Nikah ceremony performed at a Jama'at Khana.

Unlike many other groups, inter-faith marriages are recognized by the community. In addition to the other Abrahamic faiths, the prevalence of Nizari Ismailis of South Asian descent has resulted in growing numbers married to those of Dharmic faiths, such as Hinduism, Buddhism, and Jainism, as well as other Indian religions, such as Sikhism and Zoroastrianism. The Aga Khan IV has said that he has no objection to increasingly-common mixed marriages, and has met non-Ismaili spouses and children during his various deedars throughout the world. In fact, many members of his family, including his daughter Princess Zahra Aga Khan, have married non-Ismailis in inter-faith ceremonies. Child marriages are strictly prohibited. The Aga Khan IV also condemned polygamy, except in certain circumstances.

OfferingsNāndi is a ceremony in which food is symbolically offered to the Imām-e Zamān, and is subsequently auctioned to the congregation. Money obtained is used for the expenses incurred in JammatKhana. The ceremony is conducted by volunteers from the community. The food is prepared at home and is brought to the Jama'at Khana; the Mukhi (congregation head) blesses the food offering, known as Mehmāni, at the end of prayers, informing the congregation that it has been offered to the Imam and the benefits of it are for the whole Jamat. If no physical food offering has been brought to the Jama'at Khana, then a symbolic plate called the "Mehmāni plate", which serves as a substitute, can be touched during the Du'a Karavi ceremony.

The origins of Nāndi are said to be in the Prophet Muhammad's time when a similar practice occurred.

Calendar
Nizari use an arithmetically based lunar calendar to calculate the year, unlike most Muslim communities, which rely on visual sightings. The Isma'ili calendar was developed in the Middle Ages during the Faitmid Caliphate of Imam Al-Hakim.

A lunar year contains about 354 11/30 days, Nizari Isma'ili employ a cycle of 11 leap years (kasibah) with 355 days in a 30-year cycle. The odd-numbered months contain 30 days and the even numbered months 29 days; the 12th and final month in a leap year contains 30 days.

Fasting
Unlike the other branches of Islam, Nizari Isma'ilis divide the Ramadan fast into two separate, but closely related, kinds: ẓāhirī ṣawm (exoteric fasting) and bāṭinī ṣawm (esoteric fasting). The former refers to the abstention food, drink and sensual pleasure. The latter refers to the abstention from communicating the esoteric knowledge of revelation (tanzīl) and interpretation (ta’wīl) to those who are not ready to receive it.

A third kind of fasting known as ḥaqīqī ṣawm (real fasting) is the abstention from anything (in thought, word, or deed) which is contrary to the Command of God. This kind is observed year-round.

Aga Khan Development Network
The Aga Khan Development Network (AKDN) was set up by the Imamate and the Ismaili community as a group of private, non-denominational development agencies that seek to empower communities and individuals, regardless of ethnicity or religious affiliation, and seek to improve living conditions and opportunities within the developing world. It has active working relationships with international organizations such as the United Nations (UN) and the European Union (EU), and private organizations such as the Bill & Melinda Gates Foundation. Governmental bodies the AKDN works with include the United States Agency for International Development, the Canadian International Development Agency, the United Kingdom's Department for International Development, and Germany's Federal Ministry of Economic Cooperation and Development.
It's also known that the Aga Khan Development Network is funded by donations and offerings given by the followers of the Aga Khan.

Agencies

 Aga Khan Agency for Microfinance (AKAM)
 Aga Khan Education Services (AKES)
 Aga Khan Foundation (AKF)
 Aga Khan Fund for Economic Development (AKFED)
 Aga Khan Health Services (AKHS)
 Aga Khan Planning and Building Services (AKPBS)
 Aga Khan Trust for Culture (AKTC)
 Aga Khan University (AKU)
 Focus Humanitarian Assistance (FOCUS)
 University of Central Asia (UCA)

See also
 Nizari Ismaili state
 Batiniyya
 Fatimid
 Ginans
 Hashshashin
 Imamah (Ismaili doctrine)
 Imamah (Nizari Ismaili doctrine)
 Nūram Mūbin
 Shi'a Imam
 Shi'a in Africa
 Sufism

References

Further reading
For a list of Ismaili Imams: Daftary, Farhad (1990). The Ismailis: Their history and doctrines''. Cambridge, England: Cambridge University Press. pp. 551–553. .

External links
  of the Isma'ili Muslim Community.
 Aga Khan Development Network, a group of development agencies with mandates ranging from health and education to architecture, culture.
 Introductory Academic Lecture on the Ismaili Muslims
 Academic Interview on the Ismaili Islam
 Institute of Ismaili Studies, Promotes scholarship and learning on Islam,  Shi'ism and the Ismaili Tariqah in particular.
 First Ismaili Electronic Library and Database
 Who Are the Shia Ismaili Muslims?: A Primer with Visual Charts
 The Shia Ismaili Nizari Qasim-Shahi Imamat: A Timeline of Major Divisions and Developments
 The Aga Khan's Direct Descent from the Prophet Muhammad: Historical Proof
 Branches of Shia Islam
 The post-Fatimid period

Shia Islamic branches
Nizari Ismailism
History of Ismailism